Old Whittington is a village in the Borough of Chesterfield in Derbyshire, England. The population of the Old Whittington ward at the 2011 Census was 4,181. The village lies on the River Rother.

Population in 1901 was 9,416. The parish church of St Bartholomew was restored after its destruction by fire, except for the tower and spire, in 1895. The town manufactured stoneware bottles, other earthenware and bricks. There were also coal mines and ironworks.

Early history
Old Whittington is mentioned in the Domesday Book of 1086 on the first folio for Derbyshire, where it is spelt Witintune. The book says  under the title of 'The lands of the King':

In Newbold with six berewicks – Old Whittington, Brimington, Tapton, Chesterfield, Boythorpe, Eckington – there are six carucates and one bovate to the geld. There is land for six ploughs. There the king has 16 villeins and one slave having four ploughs. To this manor belong eight acres of meadow. There is woodland pasture three leagues long and three leagues broad. TRE worth £6 now £10.

The school
 A free school was founded here in 1674 which was endowed with lands which created an income of thirty two pounds and ten shillings. The school had about twenty pupils which included both boys and girls. Old Whittington now has 3 schools, the primary school is called Mary Swanwick, the special school is called Holly House and the secondary school is called Whittington Green School.

Revolution House

Revolution House is a small stone cottage, which is now a museum. This was the meeting-place of the Earl of Danby, Mr. John D'Arcy and the Earl of Devonshire when poor weather caused them to move their secret meeting inside. William Cavendish, the fourth Earl and later Duke of Devonshire, lived nearby at Chatsworth House, which is still the home to the Cavendish family. John D'Arcy (or Darcy) was the fourth son of the Earl of Holderness.

This group devised the plans to extend the invitation to William of Orange in 1688, so that the Whig party brought about the fall of James II and the succession of the Protestant William III. This change in the monarchy came to be known as the Glorious Revolution.

The house was then a hostelry, known as the "Cock and Pynot". The tiny museum today features period furnishings and exhibition of local interest. There is a public house in Old Whittington which is called the Cock and Magpie. This public house was founded in 1790 when the old 'Cock and Pynot' was converted into a cottage.

The local vicar, Samuel Pegge, was amongst about fifty dignitaries who met at Revolution House in 1788 on the centennial of the "Glorious Revolution", while it was still an alehouse. The procession was led by the Duke of Devonshire, the Duchess and the Mayor of Chesterfield.

St Bartholomew Church
The grade II listed St Bartholomew's Church was built in 1869. This is the fourth church to occupy the site, the first being the Norman church built circa 1140 AD.

Notable residents

Samuel Pegge (1704–1796), antiquary and vicar of Whittington and Heath for many years, was buried here. He was an antiquarian and published a number of books including republishing a very early cookery book, The Forme of Cury.
Thomas Gascoyne, a record-breaking cyclist who died in World War I, was born here.
Alexander Wall, (1658-1739), an explorer and officer in the British East India Company, was born here.
Frederick Swanwick (1810–1885), a civil engineer who assisted George and Robert Stephenson, lived in the village. He was responsible for much of the work on railways in the North and Midlands of England. In retirement he gave generously of his time and money to provide education for the increasing population of Whittington, building up schools in each of the three villages of old and New Whittington and Whittington Moor.
Harry Brearley (1871–1948) was an English metallurgist, credited with the invention of stainless steel. The 1911 census showed he and his family living at Elmwood House om High Street. He bought a house in Walton in 1919 but provided land for Brearley Park that was opened in 1920.

Transport
 Bus service is run by Stagecoach. Route 25 links to New Whittington and Holymoorside whilst routes 50 and 50a link to Chesterfield and Eckington and Sheffield.
Stagecoach also operates bus services 43 and 44, linking Old Whittington and Sheffield via Dronfield.

References

External links

 Revolution House - Chesterfield Museums

Villages in Derbyshire
Chesterfield, Derbyshire